Bethan Louisa Ellis (born 7 July 1999) is an English cricketer who currently plays for Warwickshire and The Blaze. She plays primarily as a right-arm medium bowler, as a well as a right-handed lower-order batter. She has previously played for Shropshire, Worcestershire and Derbyshire.

Early life
Ellis was born on 7 July 1999, and grew up in Leamington Spa, Warwickshire. She has a degree in Sports Science from the University of Birmingham.

Domestic career
Ellis began playing for Warwickshire at Under-13 level, and made her debut for the senior team in 2015, in a match against Surrey. She scored 2* and did not bowl. In 2016, she went on loan to Shropshire, and was the joint-second leading wicket-taker in their win of Division 4 S&W in the County Championship. In 2017 and 2018, Ellis split her time between Warwickshire and Worcestershire. In the 2017 Women's County Championship, she achieved her List A best bowling of 4/20 against Wales. 

In 2019, Ellis played every match for Warwickshire, in a season that saw them win the Women's Twenty20 Cup. She was the joint-second leading wicket-taker in Division 1, with 10 wickets at an average of 13.00. She also achieved her List A high score of 74 in a County Championship match against Kent. Ahead of the 2021 season, Ellis joined Derbyshire, and was the side's leading run-scorer in that season's Twenty20 Cup, with 140 runs. She also achieved her maiden Twenty20 half-century, scoring 55* against Shropshire. She re-joined Warwickshire for the 2022 season, taking five wickets and scoring 78 runs in the Women's Twenty20 Cup. In the Group 3 final against Somerset, Ellis hit 57* to guide her side to victory.

In 2020, Ellis played for Lightning in the Rachael Heyhoe Flint Trophy. She took 6 wickets in 6 matches at an average of 35.00, as well as scoring 62 in a match against Central Sparks, sharing a 148-run opening stand with Sarah Bryce. In December 2020, it was announced that Ellis was one of the 41 female cricketers that had signed a full-time domestic contract. In 2021, Ellis only played one match for Lightning, and was forced to withdraw from the Welsh Fire squad for The Hundred due to injury. She played nine matches for Lightning in 2022, across the Charlotte Edwards Cup and the Rachael Heyhoe Flint Trophy, scoring 74 runs but bowling just two deliveries.

References

External links
 
 

1999 births
Living people
Place of birth missing (living people)
Alumni of the University of Birmingham
Warwickshire women cricketers
Shropshire women cricketers
Worcestershire women cricketers
Derbyshire women cricketers
The Blaze women's cricketers